Donal "Donie" Kingston (born 12 August 1990) is a Gaelic footballer from County Laois. He had played with Barrowhouse for a short while before being granted a transfer citing residential reasons, in which he transferred to senior club Arles–Killeen.

Career Statistics 

 As of 26 July 2022

References

1990 births
Living people
Arles-Killeen Gaelic footballers
Laois inter-county Gaelic footballers